Rheinheimera marina is a Gram-negative, rod-shaped, aerobic and motile bacterium from the genus of Rheinheimera which has been isolated from a seamount in the near of Yap Trench from the western Pacific.

References 

Chromatiales
Bacteria described in 2018